is a town in Kanzaki District, Hyōgo Prefecture, Japan. , the town had an estimated population of 18,742 in 7803 households and a population density of 410 persons per km².

Geography
Fukusaki is located in the center of Hyōgo Prefecture, and occupies the middle part of Ichikawa River Basin. It is surrounded by low mountains and hills.

Neighbouring municipalities 
Hyōgo Prefecture
 Himeji
 Kasai
 Ichikawa

Climate
Fukusaki has a humid subtropical climate (Köppen climate classification Cfa) with hot summers and cool to cold winters. Precipitation is significantly higher in summer than in winter, though on the whole lower than most parts of Honshū, and there is no significant snowfall.

Demographics
Per Japanese census data, the population of Fukusaki in 2020 is 19,377 people. Fukusaki has been conducting censuses since 1920.

History
The area of the modern town of Fukusaki was within ancient Harima Province. In the Edo Period, it was mostly under the controls of  Himeji Domain with small portions as  tenryō territory under direct administration of the Tokugawa shogunate. Following the Meiji restoration, the villages of Fukusaki was created within Kanzaki District, Hyōgo. On December 1, 1925 Fukuzawa merged with the neighboring village of Tomioka and was elevated to town status.  Fukusaki expanded on May 3, 1956 by annexing the neighboring villages of Tahara and Yachikusa.

Government
Fukusaki has a mayor-council form of government with a directly elected mayor and a unicameral town council of 14 members. Fukusaki, together with the other municipalities of Kanzaki District, contributes one member to the Hyogo Prefectural Assembly. In terms of national politics, the town is part of Hyōgo 12th district of the lower house of the Diet of Japan.

Economy
Fukusaki has an economy centered on light manufacturing of electrical component, food processing, pharmaceuticals and metals processing, with agriculture playing a smaller role.

Education
Fukusaki has four public elementary schools and two public middle schools operated by the town government and one public high school operated by the Hyōgo Prefectural Department of Education. The Kinki Health Welfare University is also located in the town.

Transportation

Railway
 JR West – Bantan Line

Highway
  Chūgoku Expressway
  Bantan Renraku Road

Local attractions
Kunio Yanagita (1875–1962) Was born in Fukusaki, and due to his importance in the study of Japanese folklore, the town has a number of yokai sculptures. In Tsujikawayama Park there are currently five statues whose designs were chosen through "The National Yokai Modeling contest". A total of 17 "Yokai benches" also exist within the town. As a way to create tourism, these benches were created and placed near local businesses and other points of interest.

Kunio Yanagita's house and Matsuoka family memorial museum
        
The house of folklorist Kunio Yanagita and memorial hall to his brothers is located in Fukusaki. He wrote about his house in one of his books, Kokyou Nanajunen (70 years in hometown): "It was the smallest house in [his] hometown." The book also describes Gataro (ガタロ), a kappa. The municipal government of Fukusaki installed a mechanical kappa statue that pops out of a pond in Tsujikawayama Park to attract tourists. In 2015, the government went on to design a kappa costume for the character Gajiro (ガジロウ), who is said to be the younger brother of Gataro. Gajiro has since been adopted as the mascot of Fukusaki. Yanagita had four brothers. One of the younger brother's name is Teruo (Eikyū), a famous Japanese traditional painter. Some of his paintings are shown in the museum. The anniversary day of Yanagita's death is held at the Santou-Ki Haiku Festival.

Kanzaki-gun Museum of History and Customs

The museum is a western-style building built in 1886. It was renovated in 1972 to a museum for keeping and promoting the development of culture.

House of the Miki family

The Miki House belonged to the great chief of Fukusaki. It is said that Kunio Yanagita read thousands of books from this family when he was a child.

Suzunomori shrine

Suzunomori shrine is in the Tsujikawa region, near Kunio Yanagita's house.

Festivals
There are two Major festivals: the Autumn Festival and Summer Festival.

During the Autumn Festival, young men carry a portable shrine and pray for a good harvest. These young men often wear 'happi'.

The Summer Festival is held on the 9th of August at the playground of Fukusaki Junior High School. There are fireworks displayed, bon dancing and drum performances. As well as food/game stalls.

References

External links

Fukusaki official website 

Towns in Hyōgo Prefecture
Fukusaki, Hyōgo